Alexandre Gonzalez (born 16 March 1951) is a French long-distance runner. He competed in the men's marathon at the 1988 Summer Olympics.

References

1951 births
Living people
Athletes (track and field) at the 1980 Summer Olympics
Athletes (track and field) at the 1984 Summer Olympics
Athletes (track and field) at the 1988 Summer Olympics
French male long-distance runners
French male marathon runners
Olympic athletes of France
Place of birth missing (living people)
20th-century French people